Nantmel is a village and a community in Radnorshire, Powys, Wales, and is 76.5 miles (123.1 km) from Cardiff and 150.5 miles (242.2 km) from London. In 2011 the population of Nantmel was 621 with 11.8% of them able to speak Welsh. The population of the community was 637 as of the 2011 UK Census.

In 1870, John Marius Wilson described the village as a parish and village in the Rhayader district or Radnor.

The hamlets of Argoed, Dulas and Cynllo all lie within this community and the Ty Lettice Roman Road runs through it.

It  home to Wales National Cycle Museum and Lion Royal Hotel Trekking.

Governance
An electoral ward in the same name exists. The population of this ward at the 2011 Census was 1,465.

See also
Nantmel Aqueduct
Nantmel Landfill Site
List of localities in Wales by population

References

Communities in Powys